Azura, stylised as AZURA, is a 177-metre-tall residential skyscraper in the Mid-Levels West area of Central and Western District on Hong Kong Island. There are 50 floors with 126 apartments in total. The building was completed and occupied in the fourth quarter of 2012.

See also
List of tallest buildings in Hong Kong

References

External links
 Official website

2012 establishments in Hong Kong
Residential buildings completed in 2012
Mid-Levels
Residential skyscrapers in Hong Kong